William Henry Barrington Dalby (10 November 1893-1975) was a British boxing referee and radio and television commentator.

Early life
During the First World War he served as a clerk in the Royal Air Force.

Boxing and radio career
He was granted a British Boxing Board of Control referee's licence in 1929 and was, as of 1941, one of the three amateur referees of professional boxing.

He refereed the 1939 lightweight title match between Eric Boon and Arthur Danahar. 

His first radio commentary was of the bout between Jock McAvoy and Jack Petersen in 1939. 

He regularly commented alongside Eamonn Andrews.

He commentated for BBC Radio on the 1966 fight between Cassius Clay and Henry Cooper.

He appeared on Desert Island Discs twice, once in 1942 and once in 1960.

He also summarised football matches for the BBC Sports Report.

He played a commentator in the 1969 film The Magic Christian.

Bibliography

References

British sports broadcasters
1893 births
1975 deaths
Sportspeople from Ipswich
English sports broadcasters
Boxing commentators
British radio personalities